Pieniny National Park is a protected area located in the heart of the Pieniny mountains in the southernmost part of Poland. Administratively, the Park lies in the Lesser Poland Voivodeship on the border with Slovakia. Its head office is in Krościenko nad Dunajcem.

The Pieniny mountain chain is divided into three ranges: Pieniny Spiskie, Małe Pieniny, and the Pieniny Właściwe range where the Park is located. One-third (7.5 km2) is strictly protected. On the Slovak side of the mountains there is a parallel park called the Pieninský národný park.

History 
The idea for the creation of the National Park in Pieniny came from prof. Władysław Szafer, a member of the National Commission for the Preservation of Nature in 1921. In the same year, a private preserve on the area of 75,000 m2 was opened by Stanisław Drohojowski around the ruins of the Czorsztyn castle. In 1928, the Polish government made its first land purchases and on May 23, 1932, the Ministry of Agriculture created a “National Park in the Pieniny”, with the area of 7.36 km2. After World War II, the decision was confirmed by an October 30, 1954 act of the government, which officially created Pieniny National Park.

Features 
The Pieniny mountains consist mostly of limestone. The mountains have picturesque, almost vertical cliffs which go down to the Dunajec River. The most famous summit - Trzy Korony (Three Crowns) is 982 meters above sea level high, however Pieniny's highest mountain - Wysokie Skałki - is 1050 meters above sea level and is not located in the national park.

Pieniny National Park is located in the Dunajec river basin, and the river occupies an important position among factors that influence Pieniny's look. Even though the park is small in size, within its area thrive hundreds of species of plants, including 640 kinds of mushrooms. Sometimes, on the same rock, grow plants with opposite means of survival. The park's meadows, which are the result of human activity, are some of the richest plant ecosystems of Poland (30 to 40 species of flowers for every square meter).

So far around 6500 animal species are known to live in the Pieniny. It is believed that the area is even more abundant - with up to 15 000 species. There are numerous birds, fish, reptiles and amphibians as well as mammals. The most important predator is the lynx. On the shores of the Dunajec the otter thrives.

The first permanent human settlements in the Pieniny mountains date back to 1257, when Polish princess Kinga was given nearby lands. In 1280, the princess founded a monastery at Stary Sącz, later the Czorsztyn castle was built. This castle belonged to Poland, on the southern side of the Dunajec valley, the Hungarians built their own, then called Dunajec (today it belongs to Poland and its name is Niedzica). In 1997, the Dunajec valley was flooded as a result of construction of a river dam.

There are 34 kilometres of tourist walking trails in the park, from such peaks as Sokolica and Trzy Korony one can have excellent view on the Pieniny and the Tatra mountains as well as the Dunajec. The Park's main attraction is a river trip on wooden rafts, very popular among all tourists.

See also 
 Polish National Parks
 Dunajec River Gorge
 Dunajec river castles

External links 

 Park's official website
 More info about the Park 
 The Board of Polish National Parks
 Pieniny National Park portal page

National parks of Poland
Parks in Lesser Poland Voivodeship
Protected areas established in 1932
Protected areas of the Western Carpathians
Transboundary protected areas
1932 establishments in Poland
Nowy Targ County